Eidfjordvatnet is a moraine-dammed lake in the municipality of Eidfjord in Vestland county, Norway. The  lake is located immediately southeast of the village of Eidfjord. The village of Øvre Eidfjord lies on the southern shore of the lake. Norwegian National Road 7 runs along the western shore of the lake. The water enters the lake through the Bjoreio and Veig rivers, and the water empties from the lake through the Eio River.

See also
List of lakes in Norway

References

Eidfjord
Lakes of Vestland